The women's discus throw event was part of the track and field athletics programme at the 1948 Summer Olympics. The competition was held on July 30, 1948.  The final was won by Micheline Ostermeyer of France.

Records
Prior to the competition, the existing World and Olympic records were as follows.

Schedule

All times are British Summer Time (UTC+1)

Results

Final standings

References

External links
Organising Committee for the XIV Olympiad, The (1948). The Official Report of the Organising Committee for the XIV Olympiad. LA84 Foundation. Retrieved 5 September 2016.

Athletics at the 1948 Summer Olympics
Discus throw at the Olympics
1948 in women's athletics
Ath